Jesus is a Brazilian telenovela produced by Casablanca and RecordTV. The telenovela is created by Paula Richard and directed by Edgard Miranda. It premiered on 24 July 2018 and ended on 22 April 2019. It stars Dudu Azevedo as the titular character. Filming of the telenovela began in June 2018.

It is the fifth biblical telenovela by Record TV and it is based on Jesus, the central figure of Christianity, who is to spread love and respect among people and ends up being persecuted.

Plot 
After receiving the announcement that the son of God is on the way, Maria gives birth to the chosen one and, together with her husband José, try to raise Jesus with values and good principles. The prophecy of the chosen man troubles King Herod, who goes on to persecute the family, forcing Maria and José to raise Jesus as an ordinary young man far from his mission. Over the years, however, Jesus understands his role in the world and travels through the towns carrying the teachings of peace and equality together with his twelve apostles: Pedro, Mateus, Judas Tadeu, Tiago Menor, Tiago Maior, Natanael, Tomé, Filipe, Simão Zelote, João and André, besides the envious and without character Judas Iscariote, who waits for the right moment to betray him. They are joined by the greatest devotee of the chosen one, Maria Madalena, a Jewish Hellenist widow of a Roman who believed she was saved in the arms of the Roman centurion Petronius, but who considered her unclean, finding in Jesus liberation and becoming his most faithful disciple.

Cast 

 Dudu Azevedo as Jesus
 Matheus Dantas as Child Jesus
 Nícolas Sanches as Young Jesus
 Dayenne Mesquita as Maria Madalena
 Mayana Moura as Satanás
 Vanessa Gerbelli as Herodíade
 Marcos Winter as Herodes Antipas
 Miguel Roncato as Young Herodes Antipas
 Guilherme Winter as Judas Iscariotes
 Petrônio Gontijo as Pedro da Galileia
 André Gonçalves as Barrabás
 Luiz Eduardo Oliveira as Child Barrabás
 Fernando Pavão as Petronius
 Victor Sparapane as Young Petronius
 Cláudia Mauro as Maria de Nazaré
 Juliana Xavier as Young Maria
 Beth Goulart as Mirian de Alfeu
 Victoria Pozzan as Young Mirian
 Adriana Garambone as Adela Rakh
 Nicola Siri as Pôncio Pilatos
 Larissa Maciel as Cláudia Prócula de Pilatos
 Gabriel Gracindo as Mateus Evangelista
 Ricky Tavares as Judas Tadeu
 Rafael Gevú as João Zebedeu
 César Cardadeiro as Thiago Maior
 José Victor Pires as Thiago Menor
 Rodrigo Andrade as Simão Zelote
 DJ Amorim as Child Simão Zelote
 Pierre Baitelli as Natanael Bartolomeu
 Maurício Ribeiro as André da Galileia
 Gustavo Rodrigues as Tomé Dídimo
 Matheus Fagundes as Filipe de Betsaida
 Bárbara Borges as Livona Rakh
 Eucir de Souza as Caifás
 Ronny Kriwat as Young Caifás
 Marcela Muniz as Judite de Caifás
 Giuseppe Oristanio as José de Arimatéia
 Ana Paula Tabalipa as Asisa Bah
 Camila Mayrink as Young Asisa
 Manuela do Monte as Laila Bah
 Rafael Sardão as Simão Fariseu
 Felipe Cunha as Jairo
 Letícia Medina as Yoná de Nazaré
 Júlia Maggessi as Helena de Pilatos
 Maitê Padilha as Gabriela da Galileia
 Iano Salomão as João Batista de Jerusalém
 Raphael Montagner as Hélio
 Ana Lima as Joana de Chuza
 Tadeu Aguiar as Chuza
 Paulo Figueiredo as Anás ben Sete
 Ernani Moraes as Nicodemos
 Vitor Novello as Young Nicomedos
 Kika Kalache as Sula de Nazaré Zebedeu
 Isadora Cecatto as Young Sula de Nazaré Zebedeu
 Sacha Bali as Longinus
 Felipe Roque as Caius
 Gil Coelho as Tiago Justo de Nazaré
 Leandro Silva as Child Thiago Justo de Nazaré
 Manuela Llerena as Deborah de Arimatéia
 Valentina Bulc as Salomé Agripa
 Hall Mendes as Abel de Chuza
 Felipe Cardoso as Ami de Betesda
 Jéssika Alves as Maria de Betânia
 Dani Moreno as Marta de Betânia
 Barbara Reis as Susana
 Paulo Lessa as Goy
 Vandré Silveira as Lázaro de Betânia
 Rafael Awi as Judá de Nazaré
 Lara Lazzaretti as Eliseba de Nazaré
 André Rosa as Simas de Nazaré
 Marcel Giubilei as José Filho de Nazaré
 Fifo Benicasa as Dimas Rakh
 Flávio Pardal as Gestas Rakh
 Polliana Aleixo as Kesiah
 Guilherme Lopes as Efraim Bah
 Adriano Alves as Nemestrino
 Zeca Richa as Almáquio
 Cacá Ottoni as Diana Rakh
 Claudia Assumpção as Cassandra
 Juliana Boller as Young Cassandra
 Daniel Villas as Malco de Betesda
 Ana Barroso as Sara
 Hilton Castro as Zaqueu
 Ademir Emboava as Cornélius
 Luka Ribeiro as Shabaka
 Luiz Nicolau as Heitor
 Juliana Kaz as Bina
 Dani Bavoso as Rebeca
 Naiumi Goldoni as Liba
 Thales Coutinho as Abner
 Tiago Marques as Dylan
 Giuliano Laffayette as Aarão

Guest stars 
 Michel Bercovitch as José de Nazaré
 Guilherme Dellorto as Young José
 Paulo Gorgulho as Herodes, o Grande
 Raphael Sander as Anjo Gabriel
 Allan Souza Lima as Judas Galileu
 Maurício Mattar as Joaquim de Nazaré
 Talita Castro as Ana de Nazaré
 Bemvindo Sequeira as Zacarias de Jerusalém
 Cláudia Mello as Isabel de Jerusalém
 Dedina Bernardelli as Edissa de Arimatéia
 César Pezzuoli as Saul
 Roney Villela as Zebedeu
 Paulo César Pereio as Simeão
 Camilla Amado as Hanna
 Sthefany Brito as Dana
 Angelina Muniz as Yarin
 Adriana Birolli as Cívia de Yafo
 Pedro Lamin as Isaque de Yafo
 Marcelo Batista as Simão de Cirene
 Edson Fieschi as Tribuno
 Daniel Blanco	as Alfeu
 João Fenerich as Abiel de Betânia
 Cássio Pandolph as Melchior
 Cridemar Aquino as Baltasar
 Tatsu Carvalho as Gaspar
 Sidney Guedes as Samaritano
 Bernardo Dugin as Youssef
 Raíssa Venâncio as Adela de Betânia
 Saulo Rodrigues as Caleb
 Myrella Victoria as Talita
 Nanda Andrade as Adira
 Kátia Moraes as Elza
 Rodrigo Vidigal as Quemuel
 Gabriela Rosas as Zilla
 Rodrigo Soni as Adão
 Thalita Xavier as Eva
 Zeca Carvalho as Comandante de Herodes
 Marcos Holanda as Servo de Herodes

Ratings

References

External links 
 

2018 telenovelas
Brazilian telenovelas
RecordTV telenovelas
Television series based on the Bible
2018 Brazilian television series debuts
2019 Brazilian television series endings
Cultural depictions of Adam and Eve
Cultural depictions of Mary, mother of Jesus
Portrayals of Jesus on television
Portuguese-language telenovelas